Atlas Blue was a low-cost airline with its head office on the grounds of Marrakech-Menara Airport in Marrakech, Morocco, operating out of Menara International Airport.

Atlas Blue was a subsidiary of Royal Air Maroc (RAM), operating chartered and scheduled services to Europe. During 2010, Atlas Blue flights were rebranded as Royal Air Maroc flights, with the aircraft being re-painted in RAM livery.

History 
Atlas Blue was established on 28 May 2004 and started operations on 26 July 2004, with charter operations from Morocco to France using a single Boeing 737-400. Another 5 Boeing 737-400s were transferred from Royal Air Maroc to expand services to Belgium, Germany, Italy and the United Kingdom. Atlas Blue is owned by Royal Air Maroc (99.99%) and private investors (0.01%), and has 167 employees.

At the end of 2009, Royal Air Maroc bought Atlas Blue. The Atlas Blue website was shut down on 21 January 2010. By the end of 2010, the Atlas Blue brand ceased to exist.

Destinations 

Atlas Blue operated scheduled flights to the following destinations (as of February 2010):

Africa 
Morocco
Agadir - Al Massira Airport focus city
Al Hoceima - Cherif Al Idrissi Airport
Essaouira - Mogador Airport
Fes - Saïss Airport
Marrakech - Menara International Airport Hub
Nador - Nador International Airport Focus city
Ouarzazate - Ouarzazate Airport
Oujda - Angads Airport
Tangier - Ibn Batouta International Airport Secondary Hub

Europe 
Belgium
Brussels - Brussels Airport focus city
Germany
Düsseldorf - Düsseldorf Airport [seasonal]
Frankfurt - Frankfurt Airport
Munich - Munich Airport
France
Bordeaux - Bordeaux - Mérignac Airport
Lille - Lesquin Airport
Lyon - Saint-Exupéry Airport
Marseilles - Provence Airport
Metz/Nancy - Metz-Nancy-Lorraine Airport [seasonal]
Nantes - Atlantique Airport
Nice - Côte d'Azur Airport
Paris - Orly Airport
Saint-Étienne – Bouthéon Airport [seasonal]
Toulouse - Blagnac Airport
Italy
Milan - Malpensa Airport
Poland
Warsaw - Warsaw Airport
Netherlands
Amsterdam - Amsterdam Airport Schiphol
Spain
Barcelona - Barcelona Airport
Madrid - Barajas Airport
Switzerland
Geneva - Geneva International Airport
United Kingdom
London
London Gatwick Airport
London Heathrow Airport

Fleet 
The Atlas Blue fleet consisted of the following aircraft (as of January 2010) 

As of August 2010, all aircraft except of two Airbus A321 have been handed over to Royal Air Maroc.

References

External links

Royal Air Maroc
Atlas Blue (Archive)
Atlas Blue (Archive) 
Atlas Blue Fleet

2004 establishments in Morocco
2009 disestablishments in Morocco
Defunct airlines of Morocco
Defunct low-cost airlines
Airlines established in 2004
Airlines disestablished in 2009
Royal Air Maroc